The VIII Grande Prêmio da Cidade de Rio de Janeiro was a Grand Prix motor race held at Gávea, Rio de Janeiro on 20 April 1947. The race was planned over 20 laps but was reduced to 15 because of rain, and was won by Chico Landi in an Alfa Romeo 308. Luigi Villoresi in a Maserati 4CL started from pole and finished second. George Raph in a Maserati 6CM was third.

Classification

References

Rio de Janeiro Grand Prix
Rio de Janeiro Grand Prix
Auto races in Brazil
Brazil sport-related lists